Pedro Gálvez Egúsquiza (Cajamarca, April 28, 1822 – Paris, August 23, 1872) was a Peruvian lawyer, politician, educator and diplomat. A staunch liberal, he was one of the leaders of the Liberal Revolution of 1854 headed by General Ramón Castilla. He is remembered for having been the drafter of the decree that abolished the tribute of the natives. He was Minister of Justice and Worship in 1855, and Minister of Finance and Commerce in 1862, in the second government of Ramón Castilla; President of the Council of Ministers and Minister of Government (1868–1869) in the government of José Balta; constituent deputy (1855–1857) and senator (1868–1869). Likewise, he exercised various diplomatic representations in the United States, Latin America and Europe.

Early life
Son of Lima colonel José Manuel Gálvez Paz and María Micaela Egúsquiza y Aristizábal. Two of his brothers also became notable characters: José Gálvez Egúsquiza (1819–1866), a liberal leader who was killed in action during the Battle of Callao; and Manuel María Gálvez Egúsquiza (1838–1917), magistrate and politician.

He studied at the College of Sciences and Arts in his hometown, directed by the priest Juan Pío Burga. He for a time helped his father in the agricultural work of his farm; then, in 1842, he entered the Convictorio de San Carlos, where he graduated as a doctor of Jurisprudence (1845).

Career
He turned that school into a forum for liberal ideas, in rivalry with the convictorio de San Carlos, a forum for conservatives, led by the clergyman .

Luis A. Eguiguren commented on the Guadalupe–San Carlos discrepancy between liberal Gálvez and conservative Herrera:

He also contributed to the organization of the Progressive Club, a group with a liberal tendency, the first test of a political party, the same one that launched the first civil candidacy for the presidency of the Republic in 1851, embodied in the figure of the caudillo Domingo Elías, the same one that was defeated by General José Rufino Echenique.

Under Echenique's government, Pedro Gálvez was a member of the commission in charge of drafting the Civil Code project (1851–1852). Along with his brother José, he joined the 1854 revolution led by General Ramón Castilla. Once the revolutionary government was installed in Arequipa, he was appointed General Secretary (sole minister), and as such, he drafted and signed the decree abolishing the Indian tribute on July 5, 1854.

Once the general secretariat was dissolved, two ministries were created to replace it: the Government, Foreign Affairs, War and Navy; and that of Worship, Justice, Finance and Charity. Gálvez became Minister of Justice, Worship and Charity, a position he held from February 1 to August 25, 1855.

In 1855 he was elected deputy for Cajamarca, and went on to join the National Convention or Constituent Congress, which gave the Liberal Constitution of 1856. He was part of the commission that created the Council of Ministers of Peru.

In 1856, the government of Castilla sent him as plenipotentiary minister to Central America, with the mission of managing the adherence of the countries of that region to the Continental Treaty sponsored by Peru, to unite for a joint defense against possible foreign interventions. Having achieved this purpose, he went to New Granada and then to Venezuela, to carry out other efforts.

He was accredited as plenipotentiary minister in Spain, where he was not received, then passing with the same investiture to the court of Napoleon III in Paris (1860).

Later life
He returned to Peru, already in the final days of the government of Castilla. According to historian Jorge Basadre, he returned "cured of the liberal dalliances of his youth." He was appointed Minister of Finance and Commerce, a position he held from July 25 to October 8, 1862.

Again he was sent to France as plenipotentiary minister (1862–1864) and when he returned he was appointed dean of the Faculty of Jurisprudence of the University of San Marcos (1866–1868).

In 1868 he was elected senator for Cajamarca. When the government of Colonel José Balta was inaugurated, he joined the ministerial cabinet, occupying the portfolio of Government and the presidency of the Council of Ministers. But he resigned on April 13 of the following year, without mentioning any cause in the respective office; It was said then that it was due to a discrepancy that he had with the president.

Successively he went on to exercise diplomatic representation before the United States and various European governments, until his death in France, in 1872.

Notes

References

Bibliography

1822 births
1872 deaths
Gálvez family
National University of San Marcos alumni
Academic staff of the National University of San Marcos
Peruvian lawyers
Peruvian educators
Prime Ministers of Peru
Peruvian Ministers of Justice
Peruvian Ministers of Interior
19th-century Peruvian politicians
Peruvian people of Spanish descent